Kishor Darade is an Indian politician belonging to the Shiv Sena party. On 28 June 2018, he was elected to the Maharashtra Legislative Council from Nashik Teacher constituency.

Positions held
 2018: Elected to Maharashtra Legislative Council

References

External links
 Shivsena Home Page

Year of birth missing (living people)
Living people
Shiv Sena politicians
Members of the Maharashtra Legislative Council